The 1999 Bucknell Bison football team was an American football team that represented Bucknell University during the 1999 NCAA Division I-AA football season. Bucknell finished fourth in the Patriot League.

In their fifth year under head coach Tom Gadd, the Bison compiled a 7–4 record. Corey Hurley, Dan Palko and John Papadakis were the team captains.

The Bison outscored opponents 320 to 233. Bucknell's 3–3 conference record placed fourth in the seven-team Patriot League standings.

Bucknell played its home games at Christy Mathewson–Memorial Stadium on the university campus in Lewisburg, Pennsylvania.

Schedule

References

Bucknell
Bucknell Bison football seasons
Bucknell Bison football